René Bochmann (born 1969) is a German politician for the right-wing Alternative for Germany and since 2021 member of the Deutsche Bundestag, the German federal diet.

Life and politics

Bochmann was born in the GDR in 1969. Till 1987 he did an apprenticeship as construction worker at VEB Verkehrs- und Tiefbaukombinat Leipzig. Later he was voluntarily deployed at the Border Troops of the German Democratic Republic (Grenztruppen der DDR). Hs service ended with the reunification in 1990. Later he has a number of different jobs.

He became member of AfD in 2016. In 2021 Bochmann was elected into the Bundestag.

References

1969 births
Alternative for Germany politicians
Members of the Bundestag 2021–2025
Living people